Esmé Frances Hennessy, née Franklin (born August 1933, Umzinto) is a South African botanist, botanical artist, and author. She specializes in taxonomic botany. She wrote and illustrated South African Erythrinas, Durban 1972, Orchids of Africa 1961 with Joyce Stewart, The Slipper Orchids 1989 with Tessa Hedge, and many descriptions and plates in Flowering plants of Africa as well as work in many private collections.

Early life and education 
Esmé Franklin was born in Umzinto in August 1933 in a family of a doctor. She studied botany and zoology at the University of Natal, Pietermaritzburg, obtaining a PhD in botany in 1983. Franklin married to Lt Commander Brian Hennessy R.N. and took his surname.

Career 
From 1958 to 1960, Hennessy was employed as a research assistant at the C.S.I.R. Amoebiasis Research Unit. In 1961 Hennessy was the first woman to be appointed as a lecturer at the University of Durban-Westville. From 1973 she was a Senior Lecturer at the University of Durban-Westville, and from 1984 – Associate Professor.

In 1972, Hennessy published a book South African Erythrinas in Durban. She created numerous illustrations and descriptions for Flowering Plants of Africa and the American Orchid Society Bulletin; illustrated and co-authored Orchids of Africa (1981) with Joyce Stewart and illustrated and co-authored The Slipper Orchids (1989) with Tessa Hedge. In 1991, Hennessy agreed to be the scientific editor of Elsa Pooley’s book A complete field guide to Trees of Natal, Zululand and Transkei.

She exhibited internationally and locally, including the Hunt Institute, Pittsburgh, USA in 1977, presenting an illustrated lecture on the flora of sub-tropical southern Africa. She exhibited also at the Royal Horticultural Society London (1989,1992) being awarded two silver-gilt Grenfell Medals, and the Smithsonian Institution, Washington in 2000.

Hennessy has been involved in the American Orchid Society, Botanical Society of South Africa, Electron Microscopy Society of Southern Africa, Linnean Society of London (elected to Fellowship, 1985), Natal Orchid Society, Society of Botanical Artists, U.K. (founding member, 1988), South African Association of Botanists (founding member, 1968), South African Council of Natural Scientists (registered, 1983).

Hennessy retired from the Department of Botany, University of Durban-Westville in 1993, and is currently an Honorary Associate Professor in the School of Botany and Zoology in the University of Natal, Pietermaritzburg.

After retirement, she lives in Oregon near her son.

In 2012, Hennessy illustrated a book Beautiful Corn: America’s Original Grain from Feed to Plate by Anthony Boutard.

In 2017, Dr. Hennessy contributed six original watercolor paintings to the publication Baja Blooms: The Gardens of Los Colibris Casitas. Dr. Hennessy also helped the owners identify each plant in their Baja garden, many of which were native to South Africa.

In 2020, the Botanical Society of South Africa awarded Dr. Hennessy the Cythna Letty Medal in honor of her body of published botanical illustrations, which have made a significant contribution to the promotion of South African plants.

Selected works (authored and illustrated) 

 Clinical amoebiasis by Alexander Joseph Wilmot (1962)
 South African Erythrinas by Esmé Franklin Hennessy (1972)
 Orchids of Africa: a select review by Joyce Stewart (1981)
 The slipper orchids by Esmé Franklin Hennessy (1989)
 Of rushes, resources and riots by Esmé Franklin Hennessy (2000)
 Terrestrial African orchids: a select review by John S Ball (2009)

References 

Living people
1933 births
South African women botanists
20th-century South African botanists
Botanical illustrators
South African illustrators
University of Natal alumni
21st-century South African botanists
20th-century South African artists
21st-century South African artists
20th-century South African women scientists
21st-century South African women scientists
20th-century South African women artists
21st-century South African women artists
South African women illustrators